The Stedman TS-1 City of Leeds was a parasol wing wooden sailplane, seating two in tandem open cockpits. Only one was built, by its designer in 1934; it remained active until the outbreak of World War II.

Design and development

The City of Leeds was designed and built by R. F. Stedman, a member of what was then the Bradford and County Gliding Club, over the period 1932-4.  It flew for the first time on 21 July 1934 from Baildon in West Yorkshire.  It was a simple wooden aircraft, with open cockpits and wings of modest aspect ratio, not intended for high performance.  Its wing was built around two spars and had constant chord apart from slight leading edge taper near the tip.  There were no airbrakes or flaps.  The wing was mounted parasol fashion on pairs of parallel, broad chord lift struts which joined the spars at about mid-span to the lower fuselage longerons.

The fuselage was flat sided and hexagonal in cross section.  The cockpits were in tandem, one at the wing leading edge and the other under the wing at mid-chord. A single landing skid ran from the nose to below the wing trailing edge.  The fuselage tapered slightly rearwards, where a  straight edged tailplane was mounted on its upper surface.  The fin was small, carrying a taller, balanced, wide chord and curved rudder which reached down to the bottom of the fuselage, moving in a cut-out between the elevators.

Operational history

Plans of the TS-1 were advertised at £8-8-0 (£8.40), but only the prototype was built. This obtained its Certificate of Airworthiness BGA 213 in April 1935 after some modification and strengthening. It flew in the 1935 National Gliding Championships at Sutton Bank and remained active until a ban on private civil aviation was imposed at the start of World War II, when its designer and builder became a local chief test pilot at Blackburn Aircraft's Sherburn-in-Elmet plant. Stedman was the first, if not the only, British glider pilot to escape by parachute, baling out of a military glider in 1944.  What happened to his own glider is not known.

Specifications

References

External links
Göttingen 535 airfoil

1930s British sailplanes
Aircraft first flown in 1934